Argiope trifasciata (the banded garden spider or banded orb weaving spider) is a species of spider native to North and South America, but now found around the world. It can be found in certain areas of Europe, namely the Iberian Peninsula, the Canary Islands, and Madeira. The similar looking Argiope bruennichi is common in the Azores. They typically begin to appear during autumn from early September to late October as temperatures start dropping.

Their webs can reach a diameter of about 60 cm. The length of the web depends on the size of the spider. Webs are capable of reaching a total length of two meters.

Behavior
The female rests at the centre of the web facing downwards, with her legs often arranged in pairs, making a cross shape; some female spiders conceal themselves in a hidden location close to the web, being alerted to a potential victim by a non-sticky thread leading to the center. Some segments of the web often have thicker threads known as stabilimenta forming a decorative pattern. Male spiders are much smaller than females and have their own small webs in close proximity to the females' webs. Argiope trifasciata is diurnal, and feeds on the insects that get snared in the web. Large, powerful prey like paper wasps, are swiftly wrapped in silk to immobilise them, before being injected with toxic saliva.

Subspecies
 Argiope trifasciata deserticola Simon, 1906 (Sudan)
 Argiope trifasciata kauaiensis Simon, 1900 (Hawaii)

Web silk decorations
The silk decorations of Argiope spiders are thought of as visual signals by researchers. Even though the purpose behind the silk decorations made by Argiope trifasciata remains uncertain, there are a few hypotheses: to make the spider appear larger and to act as a warning sign. It has been shown that webs containing stabilimenta catch fewer insects because they are less cryptic, but on the other hand these webs are less often damaged by birds flying through them.

References

External links

  With images.
 Diagnostic photographs and descriptions: Argiope trifasciata Creative Commons Licensed

trifasciata
Spiders described in 1775
Spiders of North America
Spiders of South America
Taxa named by Peter Forsskål